Psathyrella caput-medusae is a species of fungus belonging to the family Psathyrellaceae.

It is native to Europe and Northern America.

References

Psathyrellaceae